Mastropiero can refer to:

 Orio Mastropiero, (d. 13 June 1192), Venetian statesman
 Johann Sebastian Mastropiero, fictional composer created by the Argentine comedy-musical group Les Luthiers
 Mastropiero que nunca, theatrical humour/music show by Les Luthiers.